Chipewyan 201A is an Indian reserve of the Athabasca Chipewyan First Nation in Alberta, located within the Regional Municipality of Wood Buffalo. It is at the southeast end of Lake Athabasca.

References

Indian reserves in Alberta